Coach is a 2018 Russian sports drama film directed by and starring Danila Kozlovsky. 
Danila Kozlovsky's debut project, where, in addition to the usual main role, he took on the role of director for the first time. A football drama about the star striker of the national team, who, after a loud failure, leaves the big sport. But he is not able to renounce his vocation and becomes the coach of an unknown team. While teaching it the art of defeating opponents the hero himself learns to conquer his internal breakdowns.

Plot
The forward of the Russian national team Yuri Stoleshnikov makes a mistake in an important match - he does not score a penalty. A scandal erupts, as a result of which Yuri finishes his playing career and leaves for a small town where he accepts the offer to start coaching at the local football club Meteor.

As a trainer of Meteor, Stoleshnikov will have to start believing in himself again, and rehabilitation doctor Varya will play an important role in this.

Cast
 Danila Kozlovsky as Yuri Stoleshnikov, football player and coach of the team "Meteor"
 Olga Zueva as Varya, rehabilitologist of the Meteor
 Mariya Lobanova as Dasha, Varya's sister
 Irina Gorbacheva as Larisa "Lara" Volskaya, president of the Meteor
 Rostislav Bershauer as Semyon Smolin, director of the Meteor
 Vladimir Ilyin as Adolf Berger, football coach
 Andrey Smolyakov as Stoleshnikov's father
 Viktor Verzhbitsky as Vladimir, mayor of Novorossiysk, Larisa's father
 Pavel Vorozhtsov as Valdis
 Igor Gordin as president of FC Spartak Moscow
 Aleksandr Ilyin Jr. as bartender, gets fans of the Meteor
 Aleksandr Oblossov as Vitya, trainer
 Dmitriy Chebotaryov as Igor Masikov (Masyanya), captain of the Meteor
 Askar Ilyasov as Rafael Khamitzhanov (Raf)
 Dmitri Sychev as Dodin, football player of the team "Meteor"
 Vitaliy Andreev as Zuev 
 Sergey Shatalov as Melnikov
 Nikolay Samsonov as Varennikov 
 Alan Gatagov as Petrovsky
 Vladislav Khatazhyonkov as Zorky
 Denis Pirozhkov as physician of the Meteor
 Yevgeny Savin as Anurov, captain of the Spartak
 Georgy Cherdantsev as cameo
 Konstantin Genich as cameo

Production

Development
This film is the directorial and screenwriting debut of Danila Kozlovsky.

According to Danila Kozlovsky, he had long dreamed of the role of a football coach. At the initial stage of his work, he considered his participation in the project only as an actor and producer, but then he realized that he would like to “tell this story himself” - as a director. At the dawn of his career, in 2005, Kozlovsky played the role of footballer Nikolai in the film Garpastum (2005) directed by Aleksei German Jr. The plot of the picture tells about football in Tsarist Russia.

All the workers of the set were dressed in the branded jackets of the Meteor team. If the camera captured one of them when shooting, that person fit into the frame as an employee of the club.

The project was created with the support of the Ministry of Sport of the Russian Federation, the Russian Football Union and personally Vitaly Mutko. Also the film received financial support from the Cinema Foundation of Russia.

About three thousand professional football players auditioned for a role in the picture, from whom the creators of the project selected about 200 people. Among them were Alan Gatagov and Dmitri Sychev; the latter compared Kozlovsky with Guus Hiddink based on the results of the shooting, who combining exactingness and democracy, managed to lead the national team to bronze medals of Euro 2008. For two months, the team, assembled from athletes and professional actors, lived on a tough athletic regimen. Kozlovsky trained with them too.

Casting
Olga Zueva, who worked with Danila Kozlovsky in the 2018 film In the Hood (ru), initially asked for the role of Varya. But Danila felt that she did not fit in the style and image, and continued to look for another performer. Meanwhile, Olga Zueva reworked the script, giving the character of her character more strength, courage and a bit of eccentricity. The director positively evaluated the proposals and approved the actress for the role.

Filming
Principal photography process continued in 2017. The training base of FC "Meteor" was shot at the Central Stadium of Novorossiysk - the home arena of FC Chernomorets. In total, six football stadiums were used in the film, including "Otkritie Arena", "Arena Khimki" and "Krasnodar Stadium".

Filming was carried out in the evening and at night - from 17 to 7 hours. In extras - in the roles of fans - about 450 people were shot.

Release
The film was released in the Russian Federation on April 19, 2018 by Central Partnership.

Reception
According to the calculations of the magazine "StarHit", the cost of the crowd scenes amounted to about 5 million rubles. The production budget of the film is 390 million rubles, the projected gross - 680 million rubles.

Critical response
The film received average ratings of Russian film critics. Browser Anton Dolin (ru) rated the film 6 points out of 10.

See also
 Legend № 17 (2013 film)
 Going Vertical (2017 film)

References

External links 

2018 films
2010s Russian-language films
2010s sports drama films
Russian sports drama films
Russian association football films
2018 directorial debut films
2018 drama films
Films directed by Danila Kozlovsky
Films produced by Nikita Mikhalkov